Agnes Meiling Kaneko Chan (Japanese: 金子 陳美齢, Kaneko Chan Meirin) is a Hong-Kong-born Japanese singer, television personality, university professor, essayist and novelist. Since 1998, Chan has been a UNICEF Goodwill Ambassador and supports the Japan Committee for UNICEF. In Japan she is professionally known as Agnes Chan (アグネス・チャン), Agnes being her Christian name.

Career

Agnes Chan began singing and playing guitar in her junior high years in Hong Kong, as volunteer work for fundraising events. She had a chance to record a cover of Joni Mitchell's "The Circle Game" with her older sister, actress Irene Chan, and it became a hit song in Hong Kong. She became famous throughout southeast Asia through several of Chang Cheh's movies, including Young People and The Generation Gap.

Chan's rendition of "The Circle Game" (1971) was totally different than Mitchell's, but very close to Buffy Sainte-Marie's 1968 version. It was/is misconstrued by many in Hong Kong that Chan was the original composer, whereas in her many Cantonese public interviews, she had yet to clarify by mentioning Mitchell or Sainte-Marie.

Japanese singer/songwriter Masaaki Hirao brought Chan to Japan, and in 1972 she recorded her first Japanese pop hit, "Poppy Flower (ひなげしの花)." Her clear voice, pretty looks, and imperfect Japanese made her a teenage idol. In 1973 her third single, "Splendor in the Grass (草原の輝き)," earned her the Japan Record Grand Prix "Rookie of the Year" award.  She graduated from The American School in Japan in 1973.

In 1973, she first appeared on Kōhaku Uta Gassen, the annual New Year's Eve musical competition aired on NHK, with "Poppy Flower (ひなげしの花)", and subsequently made two more consecutive appearances on the show.

Chan enrolled in Tokyo's Sophia University and studied for two years, after which she decided to take a break from the entertainment business and study social child psychology at the University of Toronto in Canada.

After graduating in 1978, Chan returned to Japan to resume her singing career. Her first Cantonese album was released in Hong Kong in 1979. She won a prize for her peace thesis for International Youth Year 1984. Her first concert in China, a benefit for Soong Ching-ling's children's fund, was held in 1985 at Beijing's capital gym for an audience of 54,000.

Chan's 1984 visit to Ethiopia during a drastic drought and food shortage was covered for the Nippon Television Network's annual "24-Hour TV" charity special. Through these events, she resumed her volunteer work as she continued her entertainment career.

In 1986, Chan married her former manager, Tsutomu Kaneko, and gave birth to her eldest son in Canada. When she returned to Japan the next year she would bring her infant along to the workplace, which was seen as highly controversial ("Agnes" became something of a buzzword in Japan) and raised the question of a mother's place in the working world.

In 1989 Chan began studying with Stanford University's department of education. With Myra H. Strober, she investigated the situations of 10 graduates from Tokyo University and Stanford 10 years after their graduation. This showed significant differences between the men and women of Japan and the US, and earned Chan her Ph.D in 1994. Chan returned to Japan as a lecturer, essayist, and university professor.

In 1998, Chan was appointed the first ambassador of the Japan Committee for UNICEF, established as an independent local non-governmental organisation in Japan, under agreement with UNICEF.

Chan's education had a profound impact on her singing career: by 2000 her recordings had taken a darker, moodier tone.

In 2002, Chan began her work as a novelist with Perfect Couple and Bullet Ring.

Chan released her first self-cover single, "Splendor in the Grass 2005 (草原の輝き2005)," in 2005, and Asahi beverage used the song in an herbal-tea commercial. Chan's latest single is "Flower of Happiness (しあわせの花)". In October she won the 14th Pestalozzi Education Award presented by Hiroshima University.

Her new English-language album Forget Yourself, including a duet with legendary Chinese performer Jackie Chan, was released in the United States in February 2006.

Chan is planning to release three new Japanese singles and make an album during 2007; she also plans to perform 35th-anniversary concerts in 100 Japanese cities and Beijing, China in 2007 and 2008.

In October 2007 it was reported that Chan had undergone breast-cancer surgery in a Tokyo hospital, and is expected to make a full recovery.

She is a Roman Catholic.

Present main regular programs

Television
 TV Tokyo – Kitajima Wink Heart (Ended by Sep. 2007)
 Chiba TV – Agnes' Music Salon (Ended by Jan. 2006)

Radio
 Radio Nippon(RF) – Agnes' Sunny Side Up
 RTHK – City Snapshot (September 2005 – March 2006)

Discography

Albums
1971  Will the circle game be unbroken
1972  ORIGINAL(1), Poppy flower ひなげしの花, With Love from Agnes
1973  As Stars, As Flowers 花のように、星のように, Splendor in the Grass 草原の輝き, Flower Concert
1974  Agnes's small diary アグネスの小さな日記, The Concert for Your and Me あなたとわたしのコンサート, Fly of Swallows 燕飛翔
1975  The Story of Small Love (小さな恋のおはなし), Family concert ファミリー・コンサート, Hello To Youth はじめまして青春, Say Thank You To You あなたにありがとう, Loving Songs, I Am in Love 我在戀愛
1976  Mei Mei – Dream all the time Mei Mei いつでも夢を, See You Again Some Day また逢う日まで, Where shall I go to look for my lover 愛人那裡去尋找, Agnes Chan, Memorial of Love 愛のメモリアル
1977  How are you? お元気ですか, My lover 私の恋人, With love from Canada カナダより愛をこめて
1978  Happy Again, Ready, Go! ヨーイドン
1979  Agnes in Wonderland, ABC AGNES, Carnation in the rain 雨中康乃馨, Beautiful days 美しい日々
1980  Message, Agnes Chan (Morning Star, Love robber, Wonderer) 晨星・情劫・流浪客・問我是誰, Swallow has came back 歸來的燕子
1981  Love Me Little Love Me Long, Mystic words for love 愛的咒語, Absorbed in love, Anxiety-forgetting grass 痴戀・忘憂草
1982  Song of Lijiang River 漓江曲, Half Time, Christmas Song Medley
1983  Small question 小さな質問, Girl Friends, Wish you to being mellow 願你繼續醉
1985  Loving Harmony 愛的Harmony, Love will be found – City romance 愛が見つかりそう City Romance
1990  Dear Agnes – Carpenters collection
1992  World nursery rhyme and baby-sitter song complete volume I-V 世界兒歌催眠曲全集I～V
1999  Famous baby-sitter song and nursery rhymes in the world 世界催眠曲兒歌名曲集
2000  Happy kids songs by Agnes アグネスのたのしいどうよう, English songs by Agnes アグネスのえいごのうた, Melancholy, Love, Peace & Freedom
2001  Private novel – My Love Story 私小説-My Love Story
2002  Now and Then, Agnes Chan CD BOX
2005  Lost & Found -Come to Me- Lost & Found-私のもとへ-
2006  Forget Yourself (Audio CD with DVD)
2008  Peaceful World 世界へとどけ平和への歌声-ピースフルワールド

Charted singles

{| class="wikitable"
!#||Title||Release Date/Chart Position
|-
||1||align="left"|Debut single in Hong Kong||align="right"|1971 (#1)
|-
|2||align="left"|Debut single in Japan||align="right"|1972-11-25 (#5)
|-
|3||align="left"|||align="right"|1973-04-10 (#5)
|-
|4||align="left"|||align="right"|1973-07-25 (#2)
|-
|5||align="left"|Biggest hit in Japan||align="right"|1973-10-25 (#1)
|-
|6||align="left"|||align="right"|1974-02-25 (#4)
|-
|7||align="left"|||align="right"|1974-06-10 (#6)
|-
|8||align="left"|''||align="right"|1974-09-10 (#8)
|-
|9||align="left"|||align="right"|1974-12-21 (#2)
|-
|10||align="left"|||align="right"|1975-03-25 (#7)
|-
|11||align="left"|||align="right"|1975-06-10 (#12)
|-
|12||align="left"|||align="right"|1975-08-25 (#12)
|-
|13||align="left"|||align="right"|1975-12-10 (#14)
|-
|14||align="left"|||align="right"|1976-04-10 (#8)
|-
|15||align="left"|||align="right"|1976-08-10 (#14)
|-
|16||align="left"|||align="right"|1977-04-25 (#32)
|-
|17||align="left"|||align="right"|1977-08-25 (#64)
|-
|18||align="left"|||align="right"|1977-11-25 (#68)
|-
|19||align="left"|||align="right"|1978-08-25 (#22)
|-
|20||align="left"|||align="right"|1978-11-25 (#52)
|-
|21||align="left"|||align="right"|1979-03-30 (#76)
|-
|22||align="left"|||align="right"|1979-07-25 (#97)
|-
|23||align="left"|||align="right"|1984-11-25 (#61)
|-
|24||align="left"|||align="right"|2000-06-21 (#50)
|-
|25||align="left"|||align="right"|2001-04-25 (#80)
|-
|26||align="left"|||align="right"|2001-09-21 (#91)
|-
|27||align="left"|||align="right"|2003-10-22 (#97)
|-
|28||align="left"|||align="right"|2007-03-07 (#26)
|}

Commercials
Ajinomoto
Bridgestone
ECC Junior
Meiji
Mitsubishi Electric
Suntory

Written works
1983  My Chinese Dishes by Agnes1984  Be Peaceful With Songs1984  We All Are the People Who Live on the Earth1993  Neo Woman1994  Mama You Don't Need to be a Doctor1996  We All Are the People Who Live on the Earth Part 21997  Hong Kong Guide by Agnes1999  The Road Winds Uphill All The Way (collaboration with Myra H. Strober), We All are the People Who Live For the Future2001  Positive Child Care by Agnes2002  Perfection Couple, Ring of Bullet2003  This Road Leads to the Hill (Japanese translation)
2004  Cheers to the World!, Japan, Where I Love, Messages from Little Lives2005  The Right Track-To People Who Live for the Future-, What the Marriage Life Is?(collaboration with Yoko Kitajima)
2006  Agnes' Style Aging – Chinese Herbal Detoxification, Flowers, Colors, and Birthday Messages (collaboration)
2007  We All Are the People Who Live on the Earth Part 3, 26 Words of Love for Finding Happiness by Mother Teresa''

References

External links

 Agnes Chan's Official Homepage 
 Agnes Chan International Fan Club
 Agnes Chan's Charity Work
 Pop Star with a PhD
Agnes Chan's U.S. Debut
 Course Description of Agnes University 
 Agnes University to Offer Master's and Doctorate Courses (with photo of the honorary Bachelor's diploma)

1955 births
Living people
Cantopop singers
English-language singers from Hong Kong
Japanese-language singers
Cantonese-language singers of Japan
Hong Kong academics
Hong Kong expatriates in Japan
20th-century Hong Kong women singers
Hong Kong film actresses
Hong Kong novelists
Hong Kong Roman Catholics
Hong Kong television actresses
Sophia University alumni
Stanford University alumni
UNICEF Goodwill Ambassadors
University of Toronto alumni
American School in Japan alumni
Warner Music Japan artists
21st-century Hong Kong women singers